Nimbe also known as Nimbe: The Movie is a 2019 Nigerian drama film directed by Tope Alake. The film stars Chimezie Imo, Toyin Abraham, Rachael Okonkwo and Doyin Abiola in the lead roles. The titular role is played by the lead actor Chimezie Imo and the story is based on drug abuse. The film had its theatrical release in Nigeria on 29 March 2019 and received positive reviews from the critics. The film became a huge box office success and was one of the successful Nigerian films for the year 2019. The film currently occupies 59th position in the overall list of highest-grossing films in Nigeria. The film was also nominated for the 2019 UK Nollywood Film Festival Award.

Cast 

 Chimezie Imo as Nimbe
 Toyin Abraham as Uduak (Nimbe’s mother)
 Rachael Okonkwo as Mira
 Doyin Abiola as Peju
 Odunlade Adekola as Bayo
 Sani Musa Danja as Abu
 Molawo Davis as Ralph

Synopsis 
The theme of the film revolves around a teenage boy Nimbe (Chimezie Imo) who is constantly jeered by his peers but fortunately finds consolation, love and relevance in a street gang he is introduced to by an elder neighbour he meets luck by chance. However things change in contrast as he is introduced to the dangerous path towards drug trafficking which becomes a turning point in his life. He experiences and witnesses the accompanying challenges, obstacles and consequences associated with drug abuse.

References

External links 

 
 Nimbe 
 movie reviews on UPreviews

2019 films
2019 drama films
English-language Nigerian films
Films about drugs
Hood films
Films shot in Nigeria
Nigerian drama films
2010s English-language films
2010s American films